Hossein Yari (also Hosein Yari, ; born 1968 in Tehran, Iran) is an Iranian actor. He started acting in theatre first, then joined the Iranian TV.

Filmography
Blue Whale - 2019
Wishbone - 2017
 Mazar-i-Sharif - 2017
  Baradar - 2016
 Hooshe Siah 2 (Dark Intelligence 2) - 2013
 Abrhaye Arghavani (Crimson Clouds) - 2011
 Yek Satr Vagheiat (One Line of Truth) - 2011
 Sa'adat Abad (Felicity Land) - 2010
 Hooshe Siah - 2010
 Mim Mesle Madar (M For Mother) - 2006
 Dame sobh (Day Break) - 2005
 Naqmeh - 2002
 Shabe Dahom (Tenth Night; TV series) - 2002
 Maryame Moghaddas (Holy Mary) - 2000
 Boloogh (Maturity) - 1999
 The Men of Angelos - 1998
 Silence Fly - 1998
 Donyaye Varuneh (Upside-down World) - 1997
 Sor'at (Speed) - 1995
 Akharin Marhaleh (The Last Stage) - 1995
 Hamleh Beh H3 (Attack on H3) - 1994
 Mantagheh Mamnoon'e (Forbidden Zone) - 1994
 Jaye Amin - 1993
 Goriz (Escape) - 1992
 Atash dar Kharman - 1991
 Hoor dar Atash - 1991

References

External links
 Hossein Yari at the Iranian internet movie database sourehcinema (Persian)

1968 births
Living people
Iranian male film actors
Iranian male television actors
Crystal Simorgh for Best Supporting Actor winners